The Dweller-in-Darkness is a fictional character appearing in American comic books published by Marvel Comics. He is a demon, one of the Fear Lords, who has clashed with Doctor Strange.

The character made its film debut in the 2021 Marvel Cinematic Universe film Shang-Chi and the Legend of the Ten Rings.

Publication history
The Dweller-in-Darkness was first mentioned in Thor #229-230 (Nov.–Dec. 1974), by Gerry Conway and Rich Buckler. The character is first fully revealed in Doctor Strange #30 (Aug. 1978), by Roger Stern and Tom Sutton.

The character subsequently appears in Doctor Strange #32-33 (Dec. 1978, Feb. 1979), #35-37 (June–Oct. 1979), Fantastic Four Annual #23 (1990), Doctor Strange, Sorcerer Supreme #31-33 (July–Sept. 1991), #38-40 (Jan.–March 1992), and Adventures of the X-Men #11-12 (Feb.–March 1997).

The Dweller-in-Darkness received an entry in The Official Handbook of the Marvel Universe: Horror #1 (2005).

Fictional character biography
The Dweller-in-Darkness is a demon allegedly sired by Cthulhu, from the dimension Everinnye, like the demon Nightmare. The Dweller became shunned by his people for following "The Way of the Shamblu". Like Nightmare, the Dweller feeds on the fear of living beings; fear both increases his powers and keeps him alive.

In the universe which existed before the current reality, the Dweller caused a fracture in the M'Kraan Crystal in order to bring about the destruction of the universe and absorb the fear this would cause in every being that existed. Just before the crystal shattered, however, the Phoenix Force telepathically reached out to the minds of all life and united them in peace, foiling the Dweller's scheme. As the universe came to an end, the current Marvel Universe was born.

In this new universe, when he first came to Earth, the Dweller-in-Darkness fed upon the fears created by the war between the humans of Atlantis and the Deviants of Lemuria. The Atlantean sorceress Zhered-Na discovered the existence of the Dweller and banished him with the help of Agamotto and the Atlantean god Valka. When Atlantis sank, the Dweller absorbed the fear of the inhabitants and used it to create D'Spayre and ordered him to kill Zhered-Na in revenge. D'Spayre manipulated a tribesman to kill Zhered-Na and Zhered-Na's student, Dakimh the Enchanter would battle D'Spayre over the next millennia, while D'Spayre tried to generate enough fear on Earth to free his creator. During this time the Dweller would create other beings with a similar purpose, including the demoness Spite. D'Spayre would remain his most powerful creation though.

In the 20th century, the Dweller appeared in the dreams of many humans and told them that they would gain eternal life if they died. These humans would then kill themselves but turn into Shade Thralls, powerful creatures who served the Dweller, but were vulnerable to light. His plan was stopped by the gods Thor and Hercules who fought the Shade Thralls and destroyed them. He also inspired Zoltan Drago to become the first Mister Fear.

The Dweller would create new Shade Thralls. These Shade Thralls were destroyed by Doctor Strange and Clea, but not before the Dweller finally freed himself from his prison. The Dweller witnessed the destruction of his Shade Thralls by Strange and Clea and determined that they were the largest threat to him on Earth. Over the next few months he tried to kill Strange using servants like the Dream-Weaver and several demons, but Strange defeated them all. Still, Strange's resolve was sapped by the Dweller's servants and he was overcome with fear. The Dweller decided that he had defeated Strange and stopped his attacks.

Months later, the Dweller gathered the Fear Lords and told them about his plans to create the Great Fear: a terror which would engulf humanity. In fact, the Dweller hoped that the other Fear Lords would be destroyed during this plan by Doctor Strange. Most of the Fear Lords agreed, but the Straw Man, who was benevolent to humanity, disagreed with their plan and warned Strange. The Fear Lords destroyed the Straw Man before he could tell Strange too much, but they only killed one of the Straw Man's many bodies. The Great Fear started out as the Dweller had planned; several of the Fear Lords were destroyed by Strange and his allies, but D'Spayre told Nightmare about the Dweller's true plans. Nightmare and the Dweller fought, but during their battle they generated so much fear that humanity stopped fearing and started to despair. The two were unable to feed upon this despair, but D'Spayre was and he became more powerful than the two of them. Realizing that D'Spayre had manipulated them, the Dweller attacked him, but D'Spayre destroyed the Dweller's robotic body. His head, the only living part of the Dweller, escaped.

Hawkeye and Black Widow became involved in a mission against some of the servants of the Dweller-in-Darkness on behalf of the Secret Avengers.

Powers and abilities
The Dweller has the ability to generate fear in other living beings. This fear in turn sustains and empowers the Dweller, allowing him to generate even more fear. He also has other undefined mystical powers: he can create independent creatures out of fear like D'spayre and he can turn humans who die under his influence into Shade Thralls, beings made of shadow with superhuman strength. Strong light can kill or banish these thralls.

The Dweller is immortal, does not age, and even the sorceress Zhered-Na, assisted by powerful beings like Agamotto and Valka, could only banish him, not destroy him.

The "Way of the Shamblu", the Dweller's chosen path in life, involved a ritual where the Dweller removed his head from his own body. His body died, but his head lived on, now as a corporeal being, whereas the other inhabitants of Everinnye are more ethereal. The Dweller's head is attached to a robotic body, which possesses superhuman strength, but it can detach and move with the tentacles near its mouth in case of emergency.

Other versions

Secret Wars 2099
During the Secret Wars storyline in the Battleworld domain of 2099, Martin Hargood (the 2099 version of Baron Mordo) used Alchemax's virtual unreality laboratory to summon the Dweller-in-Darkness. Meanwhile, Miguel O'Hara called in the Avengers to defend the city from the Dweller-in-Darkness allowing the Defenders to intervene without being arrested. While Iron Man, Silver Surfer, Roman the Sub-Mariner, and Hulk confronted the Dweller-in-Darkness, the rest of both teams confronted Hargood. After Hargood was knocked out, Strange was able to reverse the effects of the portal that brought the Dweller-in-Darkness and brought it back to where it came from.

In other media

Film 
 The Dweller-in-Darkness appears in the Marvel Cinematic Universe film Shang-Chi and the Legend of the Ten Rings (2021). This version has a more wyvern-like appearance and is depicted as a soul-consuming demon kept imprisoned for thousands of years by the people of Ta Lo. The Dweller uses his powers to convince Xu Wenwu that he is Wenwu's deceased wife Ying Li (it had attempted a similar trick a number of times before with other people) and manipulates Wenwu into using his Ten Rings to release him. The Dweller kills Wenwu and has its minions kill Death Dealer and many others after being freed, but is defeated by Shang-Chi, Katy, Xialing, and the Great Protector.

Video games
 In Marvel Avengers Academy, Dweller-In-Darkness appears in the mobile game, as the second chapter boss for the Doctor Strange special event.
 The Dweller-in-Darkness appears as a boss fight in Marvel's Guardians of the Galaxy. In the video game, the Dweller is a pet and minion of Lady Hellbender.

References

External links
 Dweller-in-Darkness on Marvel.com
 Dweller-in-Darkness at the Marvel Database
 
 
 

Characters created by Gerry Conway
Characters created by Roger Stern
Comics characters introduced in 1978
Marvel Comics characters with superhuman strength
Marvel Comics demons
Marvel Comics male supervillains